"Animale" is a song performed by electronic music DJ and producer Don Diablo featuring Canadian electropop group Dragonette. As of 2010, the song has reached #2 on the Flanders Ultratip chart and #33 on the Dutch Top 40 chart. The music video was released afterwards and currently has over a million views.

Track listing

Charts

References 

2010 singles
2010 songs
Don Diablo songs
Dragonette songs
Songs written by Martina Sorbara
Songs written by Don Diablo